Griseosphinx preechari is a moth of the family Sphingidae. It is known from southern China to northern, western and central Thailand, and into Myanmar.

The length of the forewings is 24–30 mm for males and 25–20 mm for females. It is similar to Pseudodolbina species but distinguishable by the presence of the field of microtrichia on the inner surface of the labial palp segment one and the choerocampine pilifer-palp hearing organ. The antennae are slightly clubbed, long, exceeding the apex of the forewing cell. The scales of head and body are narrow, semi-erect, giving a hairy appearance. The hindwing upperside is uniform brownish-grey.

Adults are on wing from April to October in Thailand.

References

Rhagastis
Moths described in 1990